Templetonia is a genus of flowering plants in the family Fabaceae. They are native to Australia. The genus is named in honour of John Templeton, an Irish naturalist and botanist.

Species
Templetonia comprises the following species:
 Templetonia aculeata (F. Muell.) Benth.
 Templetonia battii F. Muell.

 Templetonia ceracea I.Thomps.
 Templetonia drummondii Benth.
 Templetonia egena (F. Muell.) Benth. – round templetonia
 Templetonia hookeri (F. Muell.) Benth.

 Templetonia incrassata I.Thomps.

 Templetonia neglecta J.H. Ross
 Templetonia retusa (Vent.) R. Br. – cockies tongues
 Templetonia rossii (F.Muell.) I.Thomps.
 Templetonia smithiana J.H. Ross
 Templetonia stenophylla (F. Muell.) J.M. Black – leafy templetonia
 Templetonia sulcata (Meissner) Benth. – centipede bush

References 

Brongniartieae
Fabaceae genera
Fabales of Australia